Little Red Riding Rabbit is a 1944 Warner Bros. Merrie Melodies cartoon, directed by Friz Freleng, and starring Bugs Bunny. It is a sendup of the Little Red Riding Hood story, and is the first time in which Mel Blanc receives a voice credit.

In 1994, Little Red Riding Rabbit was voted #39 of the 50 Greatest Cartoons of all time by members of the animation field.

Plot

Little Red Riding Hood is depicted as an exaggerated parody of a 1940s teenage girl, a "bobby soxer" with an extremely loud and grating voice (inspired by screen and radio comedian Cass Daley, voiced by Bea Benaderet) bringing a rabbit to her grandmother in a basket. As she's introduced singing the first verse of "Five O'Clock Whistle", the rabbit pops out of her basket, revealing himself to be Bug Bunny.

The "Big Bad Wolf" tricks Little Red Riding Hood into taking an unnecessarily long mountain path to her grandmother's house by switching a "Shortcut to Grandma's" sign, and sneaks into her grandmother's house while she's away "working the swing shift at Lockheed". After kicking out a group of rival wolves who are all waiting in the house dressed as Little Red Riding Hood's grandmother, the wolf dresses as her grandmother and climbs into bed, hoping to eat the rabbit when she arrives.

When Little Red Riding Hood arrives, she begins to remark on the wolf's large eyes—only to be impatiently interrupted by the wolf, who quickly shuffles her out the door so that he can eat the rabbit. Bugs slips out of the basket and evades the wolf, but the wolf chases him through the house. The wolf, however, is constantly interrupted by Little Red Riding Hood, who continues trying to act out the original story, oblivious to the chase. The wolf begins to flirt with her in a faux French accent before yelling at her to get out.

When cornered by the wolf, Bugs irritates him by mimicking his speech and gestures, finally tricking him into singing "Put on Your Old Grey Bonnet" (prompting Bugs to hold up a sign saying "Silly, isn't he?"). After once again evading the wolf, Bugs sneaks up on him and scorches his backside with a hot coal. As the wolf howls with pain and leaps into the air, Bugs dumps a shovelful of hot coals on the floor to burn him when he lands, but the wolf manages to avoid them by doing a split and bracing himself between a bench and a chair.

Trying to weigh the wolf down and make him fall on the pile of coals, Bugs proceeds to dump various heavy objects into the wolf's arms, finally planning to drop a single piece of straw on top of the pile of heavy objects as he's on the verge of falling. Just before Bugs drops the piece of straw, however, Little Red Riding Hood once again loudly barges into the room. Finally sick of Little Red Riding Hood's interruptions, Bugs frees the wolf and puts her in his place. The short ends with Little Red Riding Hood desperately trying to hold her backside over the pile of hot coals while weighed down with the pile of heavy objects, while Bugs and the wolf share a carrot while watching in amusement.

Analysis
Little Red Riding Hood is depicted as a spindly-legged, obnoxious and loudmouthed teenage bobbysoxer. Granny is working the swing shift at the factory, and the Wolf is more interested in eating Bugs rather than eating Red. The Wolf in fact kicks Red out of Grandma's house. He and Bugs are engaged in games of chasing and toying with each other. Their games are constantly interrupted by Red, who knocks on the door to ask the wolf the appropriate questions of the standard storyline. The Wolf and eventually Bugs are sufficiently irritated to keep her suspended over burning hot coals. She is punished for her "crime" of being obnoxious and exasperating.

Warner Brothers often parodied Disney cartoons. Billy Bletcher parodied his own Disney performance in this cartoon, voicing Big Bad Wolf, just as he did in Walt Disney's Academy Award-winning classic, Three Little Pigs and its later spinoff, The Big Bad Wolf, the latter of which also incorporated the story of Little Red Riding Hood.

Like other Bugs Bunny shorts released during World War II, this film features "a more violent rabbit with a more sadistic and mocking agenda".

Cartoon Art Museum curator Andrew Farago writes, "What makes this cartoon stand head and shoulders above the 300-plus others Freleng directed is the music. Carl Stalling kicks things off with "The Lady in Red" playing over the opening credits, which is fun and all, but when Red first appears onscreen, belting out her unforgettable rendition of Cole Porter's "The Five o'Clock Whistle", you know you're in for something special. Bea Benadaret nails her performance, and within a few ear-splitting notes, you know everything you'll ever need to know about Red."

Home media
This cartoon is found on the 1989 MGM Home Video release "Bugs & Daffy: The Wartime Cartoons", the Looney Tunes Golden Collection: Volume 2 and Looney Tunes Platinum Collection: Volume 3.

Connections
This was not the only depiction of Little Red Riding Hood in an animated short. Others include Little Red Riding Hood (1922) and The Big Bad Wolf (1934) by Walt Disney, and Little Red Walking Hood (1937), Red Hot Riding Hood (1943), and Little Rural Riding Hood (1949) by Tex Avery.

Friz Freleng had already directed four fairy-tale films: Beauty and the Beast (1934), The Miller's Daughter (1934), The Trial of Mister Wolf (1941), and Jack-Wabbit and the Beanstalk (1943). He would go on to direct Red Riding Hoodwinked (1955).

Sources

See also
List of Bugs Bunny cartoons

References

External links

Little Red Riding Rabbit at the Big Cartoon Database
 
 Little Red Riding Rabbit on the Internet Archive

1944 films
1944 short films
1944 animated films
1940s animated short films
Merrie Melodies short films
Warner Bros. Cartoons animated short films
American parody films
Fairy tale parody films
Short films directed by Friz Freleng
Films based on Little Red Riding Hood
Bugs Bunny films
Animated films about wolves
Films scored by Carl Stalling
Films produced by Leon Schlesinger
Big Bad Wolf
1940s Warner Bros. animated short films
Films with screenplays by Michael Maltese